Blue Max: Aces of the Great War is a 1990 video game published by Three-Sixty Pacific.

Gameplay
Blue Max: Aces of the Great War is a game in which a flight game involves World War I aerial combat.

Reception
M. Evan Brooks reviewed the game for Computer Gaming World, and stated that "The historical gamer may find the historical verisimilitude slighted too much to yield a simulator capable of being both a learning tool and an entertaining experience. However, as noted above, the game was designed for the general market; gamers who are more into "game" than "simulation" should find Blue Max enjoyable."

Reviews
The One - Jan, 1991
ASM (Aktueller Software Markt) - Apr, 1991
ASM (Aktueller Software Markt) - Jan, 1991
Amiga Power - Aug, 1991

References

External links
Review in .info

1990 video games
Amiga games
Atari ST games
Combat flight simulators
DOS games
Video games developed in Canada
World War I video games